The following are notable Irish Presbyterians.

Clergy
 John Abernethy, 18th century Presbyterian minister and advocate for religious freedom.   
 John Alexander, linguist and patristic scholar.   
 J. B. Armour, Presbyterian minister who supported Home Rule.
 John Baird, Old Testament scholar.
 Stafford Carson, former Principal at Union Theological College and former moderator.
 Henry Cooke, 19th century Presbyterian minister.
 James E. Davey, theologian and historian, acquitted of heresy charges in 1927, elected moderator in 1951.
 Ray Davey, founder of the Corrymeela Community.
 John Dunlop, CBE, former moderator (1992), a leading participant in Northern Ireland's civic life.
 John Edgar, professor of theology, moderator and Honorary Secretary to the Presbyterian Home Mission during the Famine in 1847.
 Hugh Hanna, evangelist, Orangeman and Unionist.
 James Alexander Hamilton Irwin, Presbyterian Home Ruler who converted to the republican cause post-1916.  Appointed to the Fianna Fáil led government’s Commission on Vocational Organisation from 1939–43 and later joined the party and served on the Fianna Fáil national executive from 1945 until his death. Offered the opportunity to stand for the Presidency of the Irish Free State but declined to do so. 
 Laurence Kirkpatrick (Professor of Church History and former Principal of Union Theological College, controversially dismissed for participation in a radio interview).
 Francis Makemie, Irish Presbyterian immigrant to America; moderator of the first Presbytery in America.
 John Morrow, co-founder of the Corrymeela Community.
 Ken Newell, peacemaker and former moderator.
 Isaac Nelson, Irish Nationalist politician and advocate of home rule whose views were condemned by the moderator of the time.
 W. P. Nicholson, evangelist.
 Ruth Patterson, first woman to be ordained to the ministry of the Irish Presbyterian Church.
 David J. Templeton, murdered after press coverage regarding purchase of gay pornography.

Laypeople
 Robert Anderson, second Assistant Commissioner (Crime) of the London Metropolitan Police.
 Samuel Bill, founder of the Qua Iboe Mission (later renamed Mission Africa). 
 Thomas Blood, self-styled colonel who attempted theft of the Crown jewels. 
 James Dickey, active in the Society of the United Irishmen and hanged for role at the Battle of Antrim. 
 Robert Emmet, United Irishman and revolutionary leader.
 Watty Graham, executed for his role as a United Irishman in the Rebellion of 1798.
 Heather Humphreys, Fine Gael politician and government Minister.
 Naomi Long, Northern Irish politician and leader of the Alliance Party.
 Robert Wilson Lynd, Irish nationalist. editor of poetry and essayist.
 Mary Ann McCracken, social activist and campaigner.
 Henry Joy McCracken, leading member of the United Irishmen and rebel commander.
 Edwin Poots, Northern Irish politician and former leader of the Democratic Unionist Party.
 William R. Rodgers, radio broadcaster, script writer and former Presbyterian minister.
 Jacob Stockdale, professional Irish rugby player.
 Theobald Wolfe Tone, founder of the Society of United Irishmen.
 Billy Wright, loyalist paramilitary leader.

References

Presbyterian Church in Ireland
Ireland
Presbyterians